Helen Ware ( Remer; October 15, 1877 – January 25, 1939) was an American stage and film actress.

Early years 
Born to John August Remer and Elinor Maria (née Ware), Ware adopted her mother's maiden name as her professional name. She had three siblings, Ada, Richard, and John Remer. Before becoming an actress, she worked as a governess and a swimming instructor.

Career 
Ware debuted on stage in 1899 when she was a student at the American Academy of Dramatic Arts. Along with other students, she was an extra in a production of The Little Minister.

She had a successful Broadway stage career making her first appearance in 1899 with Maude Adams, and by her 30s, she was playing the character parts for which she became famous. She began playing character parts in silent films in 1914 and continued into the sound era. Like Louise Closser Hale, Ware was a raven-haired woman for most of her stage career, but adopted an all-blond coif toward the late 1920s at the end of the silent era and into sound movies.

Personal life
She married actor Frederick Burt (1876-1943) in 1919. 

On January 25, 1939, Helen Ware died of a throat infection, aged 61.

Filmography
 Your Girl and Mine: A Woman Suffrage Play (1914)
 The Price (1915)
 Cross Currents (1915)
 Secret Love (1916)
 The Garden of Allah (1916)
 The Haunted Pajamas (1917)
 National Red Cross Pageant (1917) *Lost film
 Thieves' Gold (1918) *Lost film
 The Deep Purple (1920) *Undetermined/presumably lost
 Colorado Pluck (1921)
 Beyond the Rainbow (1922)
 Fascination (1922) *Undetermined/presumably lost
 Mark of the Beast (1923)
 Soul-Fire (1925)
 Napoleon's Barber (1928) *Lost film
 New Year's Eve (1929) *Lost film
 Speakeasy (1929) *Lost film, but the soundtrack survives
 The Virginian (1929) as Mrs. 'Ma' Taylor
 Half Way to Heaven (1929)
 Slightly Scarlet (1930)
 She's My Weakness (1930)
 Abraham Lincoln (1930)
 One Night at Susie's (1930)
 Tol'able David (1930)
 Command Performance (1931)
 Party Husband (1931)
 I Take This Woman (1931)
 The Reckless Hour (1931)
 The Night of June 13 (1931)
 Flaming Gold (1932)
 Ladies They Talk About (1933)
 Girl Missing (1933)
 The Keyhole (1933)
 The Warrior's Husband (1933)

 She Had to Say Yes (1933)
 Morning Glory (1933)
 Sadie McKee (1934)
 That's Gratitude (1934)
 Secret of the Chateau (1934)
 Romance in Manhattan (1935)
 What's the Idea? (1935) *short

References

Bibliography 
 HELEN WARE TIRES OF THE STAGE: Says It Is Drudgery ... New York Times article dated Monday September 11, 1911

External links

 
 
 Helen Ware portrait gallery NY Public Library B.Rose Collection
 Helen Ware  portrait early in her career University of Louisville, Macauley Theater Collection
 Helen Ware  in long pre World War I dress University of Louisville Macauley Theater Collection
 Helen Ware in The Actor's Birthday Book 3rd Edition by Johnson Briscoe
 Helen Ware stage and film portraits; University of Washington, Sayre collection
portrait 1923 with Josephine Victor and Henrietta Metcalfe(University of Kentucky) (Wayback Machine)

1877 births
1939 deaths
19th-century American actresses
American stage actresses
Actresses from San Francisco
20th-century American actresses